Neocron 2: Beyond Dome of York is a 2004 video game which is a follow-up to 2002's Neocron. Originally slated to be an expansion pack Neocron 2 was released separately under a new publisher, 10tacle Studios AG.

References 

2004 video games
Massively multiplayer online role-playing games
Massively multiplayer online first-person shooter games
Post-apocalyptic video games
Cyberpunk video games
Video games developed in Germany
Video games set in the 28th century
Windows games
Windows-only games
Reakktor Studios games
10tacle Studios games